New Hampshire Route 49 (abbreviated NH 49) is a  east–west state highway in Grafton County, within the White Mountains in central New Hampshire. It runs from Campton to Waterville Valley, and serves mainly to allow traffic to access the Waterville Valley Resort ski area.

Route description 

The western terminus of NH 49 is in Campton at U.S. Route 3. Heading east over the Pemigewasset River, there is an interchange with I-93 (exit 28) shortly after the bridge. Turning northeast to follow the Mad River, NH 49 passes through the Lower and Upper Villages of Campton, intersecting with NH 175 before entering the town of Thornton. Passing the community of Goose Hollow, NH 49 enters the White Mountain National Forest as it crosses from the west to the east bank of the Mad River, and enters the town of Waterville Valley. Upon entering the Waterville Valley Resort, the state route ends, though signage is unclear exactly where. NH 49 is one of the few New Hampshire State Routes which does not end at another numbered route. The Waterville Valley portion of Rt. 49 is named for Army SPC Marc Decoteau, killed in Afghanistan on January 29, 2010.

NH 49 is the only road into or out of Waterville Valley during the winter. In the summer months residents can also take Tripoli Road to the northwest.

Junction list

Road names
NH 49 uses the following road names:

Campton
Campton Village Road
Waterville Road

Waterville Valley
Waterville Road
Valley Road
SPC Marc P. Decoteau Memorial Highway

References

External links

 New Hampshire State Route 49 on Flickr

049
Transportation in Grafton County, New Hampshire